The Apple Blossom Handicap is a Grade I American Thoroughbred horse race for fillies and mares that are four years old or older, run under handicap conditions over a distance of one and one-sixteenth miles on the dirt track held annually in April at Oaklawn Park in Hot Springs, Arkansas.  The 2022 running carried a purse of $1,000,000.

History

The race over the years has become the premier event for distaffers in the Spring, however its beginnings were inconsistent and were far from what we see today.

Nonetheless, the inaugural running was on 21 March 1958, as the Apple Blossom Purse, for horses three-years-old or older over the current distance and was won by the three year old colt Count De Blanc in a time of 1:43. The event at that time was a preparatory event for the Arkansas Derby because in his next start Count De Blanc duly proceeded to win that event. The current preparatory event for the Arkansas Derby is the Rebel Stakes but that event was not first run until 1962.

The event was not held again until 1963. Oaklawn Park acknowledges in their records that the event was won by Verna Lea Farm's four year old Submerge. Outside resources indicate that the event was held on 6 March 1963 as a claiming race for horses four years old or older over a distance of six furlongs. The event again was idle until 1968 when it was held as the Apple Blossom Purse for three year olds and older. The following year in 1969 the event was held as the Apple Blossom Handicap.

In 1973 the administration of Oaklawn Park modified the conditions of the event to allow only for fillies and mares that are four years old or older to start.

In 1975 the distance of the event was increased to one mile and seventy yards. That year the Champion Susan's Girl won the event in her only visit to the track  in her 63 race career. The win would bring her career winnings to close to the record $1 million which would be first for a US filly or mare.

The American Graded Stakes Committee in 1977 upgraded the event to Grade III status and in quick succession upgraded it again to Grade II the following year.

In 1980 the distance of the event was increased slightly by 40 yards to one and one-sixteenth miles. The purse for the event had risen substantially to over $200,000 by 1981 and with the best female competitors entering the event the status of the race had been set at Grade I.

The list of champions who had won the event in the 20th century was impressive, includes: Susan's Girl, Canadian champion Northernette, Track Robbery, North Sider, Argentine bred Bayakoa, Paseana from Argentina who won the event twice and was third as an eight-year-old in 1995 to the 1994 US Three-Year-Old Champion filly Heavenly Prize, Escena and Banshee Breeze.

In the 2000s Allen E. Paulson's Champion mare Azeri won the event for a record three times becoming the US Horse of the Year of 2002, and the US Champion Older Female Horse three years running: 2002, 2003, and 2004. In her honor Oaklawn Park in 2005 renamed the Oaklawn Breeders' Cup Stakes to the Azeri Stakes.

The champion mare Zenyatta won the event twice (2008, 2010) during her phenomenal nineteen race winning streak. In 2010 Oaklawn Park president Charles J. Cella was negotiating with the owners of the two top females in U.S. racing in 2009, Rachel Alexandra and Zenyatta to have a purse of $5 million if both horses were to start. However, the day after a loss by Rachel Alexandra in the New Orleans Ladies at the Fair Grounds her connections announced that she would not run in the Apple Blossom.

The 2019 winner Midnight Bisou continued winning four more events before finishing second in the Breeders' Cup Distaff at Santa Anita Park. Nonetheless, her record during the year was strong enough to have her crowned US Champion Older Female Horse for the year.

The prize money of the event was scheduled to increase from $750,000 to $1,000,000 in 2020 but was reduced to $600,000 due to the COVID-19 pandemic in the United States reducing fan attendance. In 2021, the purse was increased to $1,000,000 to attract champions Monomoy Girl and Swiss Skydiver.

Records
Speed record:  
 miles – 1:40.29 Heatherten  (1984) (New race and track record)
 1 mile and 70 yards – 1:40.60 Summertime Promise (1976)

Margins:
 lengths  – By Land by Sea (1988)
Most wins:

3 – Azeri (2002, 2003, 2004)

Most wins by a jockey:
7 – Mike E. Smith (1994, 2002, 2003, 2004, 2008, 2010, 2019)

Most wins by a trainer:
4 – William I. Mott (1984, 1985, 1998, 2014)

Most wins by an owner:
4 – Allen E. Paulson (1998, 2002, 2003, 2004)

Winners

Legend:

 
 

Notes:

§ Ran as an entry

† In the 1968 running Big Tim won the race but was disqualified to second after stewards ruled she had bumped and interfered with Roman K.

♯ In the 1970 running American Victory was first past the post but was disqualified by the stewards for interference on the fourth-place finisher Roaring Thunder after his jockey Louis Cacioppo lodged a complaint against Larry Snyder. Marion Van Berg's entry of Zuke's Bad Boy and Roaring Thunder was declared the winner and Royal Cap was moved to second. American Victory was moved to fourth.

‡ Claiming event

See also
List of American and Canadian Graded races

External links
 Oaklawn Park Media Guide 2020
Ten Things You Should Know About the Apple Blossom Handicap at Hello Race Fans!

References

Mile category horse races for fillies and mares
Grade 1 stakes races in the United States
Horse races in Arkansas
Oaklawn Park
1958 establishments in Arkansas
Recurring sporting events established in 1958
Graded stakes races in the United States